The alveolar and dental ejective stops are types of consonantal sound, usually described as voiceless, that are pronounced with a glottalic egressive airstream. In the International Phonetic Alphabet, ejectives are indicated with a "modifier letter apostrophe" ⟨ʼ⟩, as in this article. A reversed apostrophe is sometimes used to represent light aspiration, as in Armenian linguistics ⟨p‘ t‘ k‘⟩; this usage is obsolete in the IPA. In other transcription traditions, the apostrophe represents palatalization: ⟨pʼ⟩ = IPA ⟨pʲ⟩. In some Americanist traditions, an apostrophe indicates weak ejection and an exclamation mark strong ejection: ⟨k̓ , k!⟩. In the IPA, the distinction might be written ⟨kʼ, kʼʼ⟩, but it seems that no language distinguishes degrees of ejection.

In alphabets using the Latin script, an IPA-like apostrophe for ejective consonants is common. However, there are other conventions. In Hausa, the hooked letter ƙ is used for /kʼ/. In Zulu and Xhosa, whose ejection is variable between speakers, plain consonant letters are used: p t k ts tsh kr for /pʼ tʼ kʼ tsʼ tʃʼ kxʼ/. In some conventions for Haida and Hadza, double letters are used: tt kk qq ttl tts for /tʼ kʼ qʼ tɬʼ tsʼ/ (Haida) and zz jj dl gg for /tsʼ tʃʼ cʎ̥˔ʼ kxʼ/ (Hadza).

In Oromo /tʼ/ is written as ⟨x⟩.

Features
Features of the alveolar ejective:

 There are four specific variants of :
 Dental, which means it is articulated with either the tip or the blade of the tongue at the upper teeth, termed respectively apical and laminal.
 Denti-alveolar, which means it is articulated with the blade of the tongue at the alveolar ridge, and the tip of the tongue behind upper teeth.
 Alveolar, which means it is articulated with either the tip or the blade of the tongue at the alveolar ridge, termed respectively apical and laminal.
 Postalveolar, which means it is articulated with either the tip or the blade of the tongue behind the alveolar ridge, termed respectively apical and laminal.

Occurrence

Dental or denti-alveolar

Alveolar

See also
 List of phonetic topics

Notes

References

External links
 
 

Alveolar consonants
Ejectives
Oral consonants
Central consonants